The name Joan has been used for one tropical cyclone in the Atlantic Ocean, ten tropical cyclones in the Western Pacific, and two tropical cyclones in the Southwest Pacific.

In the Atlantic:
Joan was used for one tropical cyclone in the Atlantic:
  Hurricane Joan (1988) – passed over the Guajira Peninsula in northern Colombia and northwestern Venezuela made landfall in Nicaragua; after crossing Central America into the Pacific, the cyclone was renamed Tropical Storm Miriam.

The name Joan was retired after the 1988 season, and was replaced by Joyce in the 1994 season.

In the Western Pacific:
 Typhoon Joan (1951) (T5105) – did not affect land.
 Typhoon Joan (1955) (T5520) – did not affect land.
 Typhoon Joan (1959) (T5909, 21W) – a 185 mph Category 5 typhoon that made landfall on Taiwan.
 Typhoon Joan (1962) (T6205, 37W) – hit South Korea
 Tropical Storm Joan (1964) (T6429, 44W) – a relatively weak storm which hit Vietnam and became one of the Western Pacific's deadliest systems, killing at least 7,000 people.
 Tropical Storm Joan (1967) (T6717, 20W) – a long-lived tropical storm that did not affect land.
 Typhoon Joan (1970) (T7019, 21W, Sening) – a powerful and devastating typhoon that impacted southeastern Luzon as a Category 5-equivalent typhoon and eastern Hainan island as a Category 1.
 Tropical Storm Joan (1973) (T7311, 12W, Elang) – approached Taiwan and struck China.
 Typhoon Joan (1976) (T7621, 21W) – did not affect land.
 Typhoon Joan (1997) (T9724, 28W) – While near peak intensity, Joan passed between Anatahan and Saipan in the Northern Marianas Islands as a Category 5.

In the Australian region:
 Cyclone Joan (1965) – Category 3 cyclone, made landfall in Western Australia.
 Cyclone Joan (1975) – 145 mph Category 4 cyclone, made landfall in Western Australia at peak intensity.

See also 
 Hurricane Joanne, a similar name used in the eastern Pacific Ocean.

Atlantic hurricane set index articles
Pacific typhoon set index articles
Australian region cyclone set index articles